Quercus crispula, commonly known as mizunara from the Japanese, is a deciduous broad-leaved tree of the genus Quercus. As Quercus mongolica var. crispula, it is considered a variety of Mongolian oak by some authorities, and is widely distributed in Northeast Asia.

Description
It prefers a colder climate than the closely related Quercus serrata and Kunugi (Quercus acutissima). It grows naturally from the mountains of Japan to the subalpine zone. Along with beech, it is one of the main tree species of deciduous broad-leaved forest in Japan, preferring slightly brighter places than beech. The tree height reaches 35 m in large ones. The leaves are dull green and have sharp serrations (jagged contours) that are more wavy than a typical oak. Flowers of about 5 cm in length bloom in May–June, and the acorns ripen in the fall.

Use
Mizunara is most widely known outside Japan for its use in barrels to age Japanese and Scotch whisky. It has received international acclaim as a material that can brew a delicate flavor completely different from oak barrels. The heartwood is dull brown, with excellent workability, colorability, high strength, and solid feeling. The wood is used in high-end furniture, building materials, and alcohol barrels. In particular, Hokkaido varieties were considered to be of good quality, and they were called Japanese oak, and were exported and gained prominence.

They have also become popular since the 20th century for the cultivation of shiitake mushrooms.

During the Jōmon period, it was important as a preserved food for winter in the eastern part of Japan. It was eaten in mountain villages until recently, but is rarely eaten now. The acorns of Quercus crispula contain astringent tannins and cannot be eaten as they are, but must be processed to become edible.

Related images

References

External links 

  line drawing,  Flora of China Illustrations vol. 4, fig. 365, 1-3
 
 

crispula